The Brampton municipal election, 2006 took place on 13 November 2006, to elect a mayor, five regional councillors and five city councillors in the city of Brampton, Ontario, Canada. It was held in conjunction with all other municipalities in Ontario. See 2006 Ontario municipal elections.

It was referred to as CityVote 2006 by the City's website.

The nomination period ended on Friday 29 September 2006; thirty candidates registered in the two weeks prior. Six candidates withdrew after this point, before the cut-off of 5 pm Monday. There was a total of 96 candidates running for political office.

Over the various days of voting, 68,186 Brampton residents cast ballots; there were 226,869 registered voters in the city at the time. This means there was a 30.8% turn-out.

Candidates

Mayor

Results

Profiles

Susan Fennell (incumbent)
OFFICIAL WEBSITE | GUARDIAN ARTICLE
 Mayor Fennell served as a city councillor, then a regional councillor, prior to becoming Mayor. She is currently a member of the Peel Regional Police Services Board, Large Urban Mayors Caucus of Ontario, the board of Hydro One Brampton, the Greater Toronto Marketing Alliance, Toronto Region Immigrant Employment Council, and two time chair of the Infrastructure and Transportant Committee of the Federation of Canadian Municipalities. Previously she was commissioner of the National Women's Hockey League, and involved in the Brampton Board of Trade, Downtown Business Improvement Area, and Sheridan College Board of Governors.

Sunny Gandhi
OFFICIAL WEBSITE | GUARDIAN INTERVIEW
 Gandhi is a 29-year-old small business owner, with no previous political experience.

Amjid Iqbal
GUARDIAN ARTICLE, stating Iqbal did not participate in interviews.
 Iqbal is a 35-year-old mortgage agent, at one point he was an automobile trader. The extent of Iqbal's previous political experience was a 2003 campaign for regional council, placing fourth out of four candidates with 5.74%.

John R.A. Moulton
GUARDIAN INTERVIEW
 Moulton is a 49-year-old "entrepreneur", living in downtown Brampton. He is placed 170th out of 174 in the Canadian Classic Table Hockey Federation's rankings as of October 9, 2006. Moulton described himself as a "clown" in the closing statements of a televised debate. Fennell asked Moulton not to make such self-defacing comments. Moulton's only other comments were regarding the level of Fennell's campaign donations, a practice he does not participate in, feeling it leads to bias; Fennell defends the process, stating it essentially to letting citizens know of her platform.

 Moulton previously lost to incumbent Grant Gibson in 2003, when aiming to be elected as Regional Council member 1 & 5. Little press, if any, was given to Moulton at that time.

 Moulton left no contact information for the voting public on the City's election website, and little to no information is available on him online.

Raj Sharda
OFFICIAL WEBSITE | GUARDIAN INTERVIEW
 Rajneesh Sharda is a 40-year-old lawyer. He was appointed as a replacement councillor for both the Town of Oakville and the Halton Region, upon retirement of the Ward 2 representative, serving from June to 30 November 2000. Sharda serves as a provincial adjudicator on the Ontario Consent and Capacity Board, is immediate past president of the Halton Multicultural Council, and was once on the board of the Advocacy Centre for the Elderly. He is legal advisor for the Brampton Small Business Enterprise Centre and the Indo-Canada Chamber of Commerce, He was endorsed for mayor by the Toronto Star on November 6, 2006.

Media participation
 The Brampton Guardian: Susan Fennell, Sunny Gandhi, John Moulton, and Raj Sharda participated in interviews with the Guardian. The newspaper was unable to attract Amjid Iqbal, despite multiple attempts.
 Rogers Television: Susan Fennell, John Moulton, and Raj Sharda all participated in a televised debate for Rogers Cable. Sunny Gandhi had accepted, but declined when he found out the interview wasn't public; Amjid Iqbal gave the Brampton Guardian no reason for his absence. The program repeats frequently on channel 10 for any Rogers subscriber in Brampton.
 Wikinews: None of the five candidates have completed interviews for Wikinews. Raj Sharda's campaign had promised a response, but nothing has been received. John Moulton replied, denying an interview. Campaign offices for Susan Fennell, Sunny Gandhi, and Amjid Iqbal did not reply.
 The Brampton News: Playwright columnist T. Gregory Argall emailed all of his council candidates, as well as the mayoral noms. Not revealing he was writing for the News. Moulton and Sharda replied via email. Gandhi and Fennell both arrived at his house. As per routine, Iqbal did not reply in any fashion. Note that all Wikinews articles were republished on The Brampton News.

Wards 1, 5

Regional council

Long-time incumbent Elaine Moore had three people interested in replacing her as Regional Councillor; she won her re-election with a strong majority.

City council

Incumbent Grant Gibson had six candidates challenging his re-election; he was re-elected by over half of participating voters. Gibson had held the seat for more than a decade, as of the election day.

Among his challengers was Stephanie Beaumier, daughter of Brampton West MP Colleen Beaumier. As he dropped out of the campaign after nomination lists were finalised, Malcolm Jones' name still appeared on the ballots. Despite no longer officially running, he took fourth place, out of seven.

Wards 2, 6

Regional council
One of the longest sitting incumbents, Paul Palleschi had five people attempting to take him out of office.  Palleschi received roughly 45% of the vote.

City council

Incumbent John Hutton had ten candidates challenging his re-election, the most of any riding. Due to the berth of competition, he was only re-elected with 27% support. Among the challengers was Doug Whillans, son of Ken Whillans, a former Brampton mayor. As of election day, Hutton had held the seat for 21 years.

Wards 3, 4

Regional council

Businessman and 2005 Brampton Citizen of the Year John Sanderson beat incumbent Susan DiMarco. One of four challengers, Sanderson had previous run and lost for the same ward in 2003. With a mere 292 votes dividing them, the race between Sanderson and DiMarco was the last to be declared in all of Peel.

Note, Tejinder Singh Bhatta has withdrawn from the race.

City council

Incumbent Bob Callahan easily won this race. Once an MPP, Callahan won over his nearest competitor by 33.36%.

Babra's second-place finish was unexpected, as while he participated in a Brampton Guardian interview, he did not reply to The Toronto Star or The Brampton News/Wikinews. His email address was inactive throughout the duration of his campaign.

Note, Ernie Macdonald has withdrawn from the race.

Wards 7, 8

Regional council

Long-time incumbent Gael Miles easily won the election for regional councillor (Wards 7 and 8), against political newcomer John Villella.

City council

Incumbent Sandra Hames won with little trouble, garnering also three out of every four votes.

Note, Curtis Grant and Oscar R. Odulio have both withdrawn from the race.

Wards 9, 10

Regional council

Incumbent John Sprovieri had six candidates challenging his re-election, which he won with 44.91% support. Among the challengers is Derek Begley, son of retired regional councillor Rhoda Begley. Johal is known in the ward as a star candidate.

City council

Garnett Manning had five people contesting his seat, which he eventually lost to Vicky Dhillon. Manning had beat Dhillon by a slim amount in the 2003 election. At time of election, Dhillon was the Brampton—Springdale riding association president for the Liberal Party of Canada (Ontario); it is unknown if he will retain this position. Among the other candidates was Daljit Gill, a one-term Peel District School Board trustee.

Note, Iqbal Dhillon, David A. Esho, and Whoston Wray have all withdrawn from the race.

Peel District School Board

The Peel District School Board runs a website about its trustees and their roles.

Wards 1, 3

 David Green, incumbent
 Ian Irving
 Dhaval R. B. Patel
 Richard Gordon Patywich
 Satwant Singh Sidhu

Note, Laura J. Zilney has withdrawn from the race.

Wards 2, 9, 10

There is no incumbent in these wards, as one-term trustee Daljit Gill is running for city council.

 Gurmail Singh Dhir
 Suman Gupta
 Ibrar Khan OFFICIAL WEBSITE
 Iqbal Mahal
 Suzanne Nurse OFFICIAL WEBSITE
 Maninder Sethi
 Harbans Singh

Note, Mahesh Malhi, Pretam Kaur Purewal, Maninder Singh, and Raguhbir Singh have all withdrawn from the race.

Wards 4, 5, 6

 Steve Kavanagh, incumbent OFFICIAL WEBSITE
 Victoria D. Nelson, ran in 2003 election for wards 4, 5 & 6.
 Gary Rao
 Raguhbir Singh
 Carole Walker
 Fraser K. Williamson, ran in 2003 election for wards 4, 5 & 6.

Wards 7, 8

Beryl Ford is the only person elected by acclamation to any political seat in Brampton; this is her eighth term as a trustee.

 Beryl Ford, incumbent

Dufferin-Peel Catholic District School Board

Wards 1, 3, 4

There is no incumbent in these wards.

 Tony Da Silva
 Shirley Packalen
 Steven Thomas, ran in 2003 election for wards 1, 3 & 4

Wards 2, 5, 6
Debates in this ward received extremely small audiences. Eleven, then six people showed up to two separate evenings.

 Frank Turner
 Linda Zanella, incumbent

Wards 7, 8, 9, 10

There is no incumbent in these wards.

 Joyce Anderson
 Lety Armstrong
 Janice Gordon
 Jeffrey Grima
 Carmela Marino

Conseil scolaire de district du Centre-Sud-Ouest

None of the incumbents are seeking re-election

Conseil scolaire de district catholique Centre-Sud

References

External links

 2006 election results (PDF)
 Brampton Guardian candidate interviews: 1 & 5, 2 & 6, 3 & 4, 7 & 8, 9 & 10

Municipal election 2006
2006 Ontario municipal elections